Belkotgadhi is a municipality located in Nuwakot District of Bagmati Province of Nepal. The municipality was established on 10 March 2017 merging the former VDCs: Belkot, Kumari, Duipipal, Ratmate, Jiling and Madanpur The municipality is divided into 13 wards and the headquarter (admin centre) of the municipality declared at Jiling. The municipality spans   of area, with a total population of 39,888 individuals according to a 2011 Nepal census.

References

External links
official website of the rural municipality

Municipalities in Nuwakot District
Nepal municipalities established in 2017